Rehabilitation in Serbia refers to the rehabilitation of people convicted during the Communist Yugoslavian period in Serbia.

Notable rehabilitated people

2007
Radule Božović - Serbian Orthodox priest executed in 1945 for being a member of the Chetnik movement
Slobodan Jovanović - member of the Kingdom of Yugoslavia's government in exile
Blagoje Krušić - World War I soldier, executed for collaboration with Chetniks in World War II
Dragoslav Mihailović - writer
Mihailo Milovanović - painter
Dimitrije Mladenović - Mayor of Pirot 
Momčilo Ninčić - minister of foreign affairs in the Kingdom of Yugoslavia's government in exile

2008
Grigorije Božović - reporter
Đoka Dunđerski - wealthy industrialist whose wealth was confiscated
Dragoslav Stojanović - reporter who worked on Serbian newspaper Nove vreme during World War II
Dragoslav Marjanović and Miodrag Vesić - convicted as members of the Chetnik movement in 1956

2009
Dragiša Cvetković - prime minister of the Kingdom of Yugoslavia
Veljko Guberina - lawyer

2011
Paul Karađorđević - prince and regent of the Kingdom of Yugoslavia

2012
Milan Antić - minister for the Royal Court
Momčilo Janković - minister in the Government of National Salvation

2013
Tomislav Karađorđević - prince of the Kingdom of Yugoslavia
Velisav Petrović - president of the municipality of Divci murdered by Partisans in 1941
113 German civilians from Odžaci killed in 1944

2014
Radoslav Grujić - professor at Belgrade's Faculty of Theology
Andrej Karađorđević - prince of the Kingdom of Yugoslavia
Marija Karađorđević - queen of the Kingdom of Yugoslavia

2015
Alexander, Crown Prince of Yugoslavia - crown prince of Serbia
Peter II of Yugoslavia - King of Yugoslavia
Draža Mihailović - general and Chetnik leader

References

Political history of Serbia